The 1935–36 Svenska Serien season was the first season of the Svenska Serien, the top level ice hockey league in Sweden. AIK won the first league championship.

Final standings

External links
1935-36 season

Svenska Serien (ice hockey) seasons
Swe
1935–36 in Swedish ice hockey